= Patrick Jamon =

French-born chef

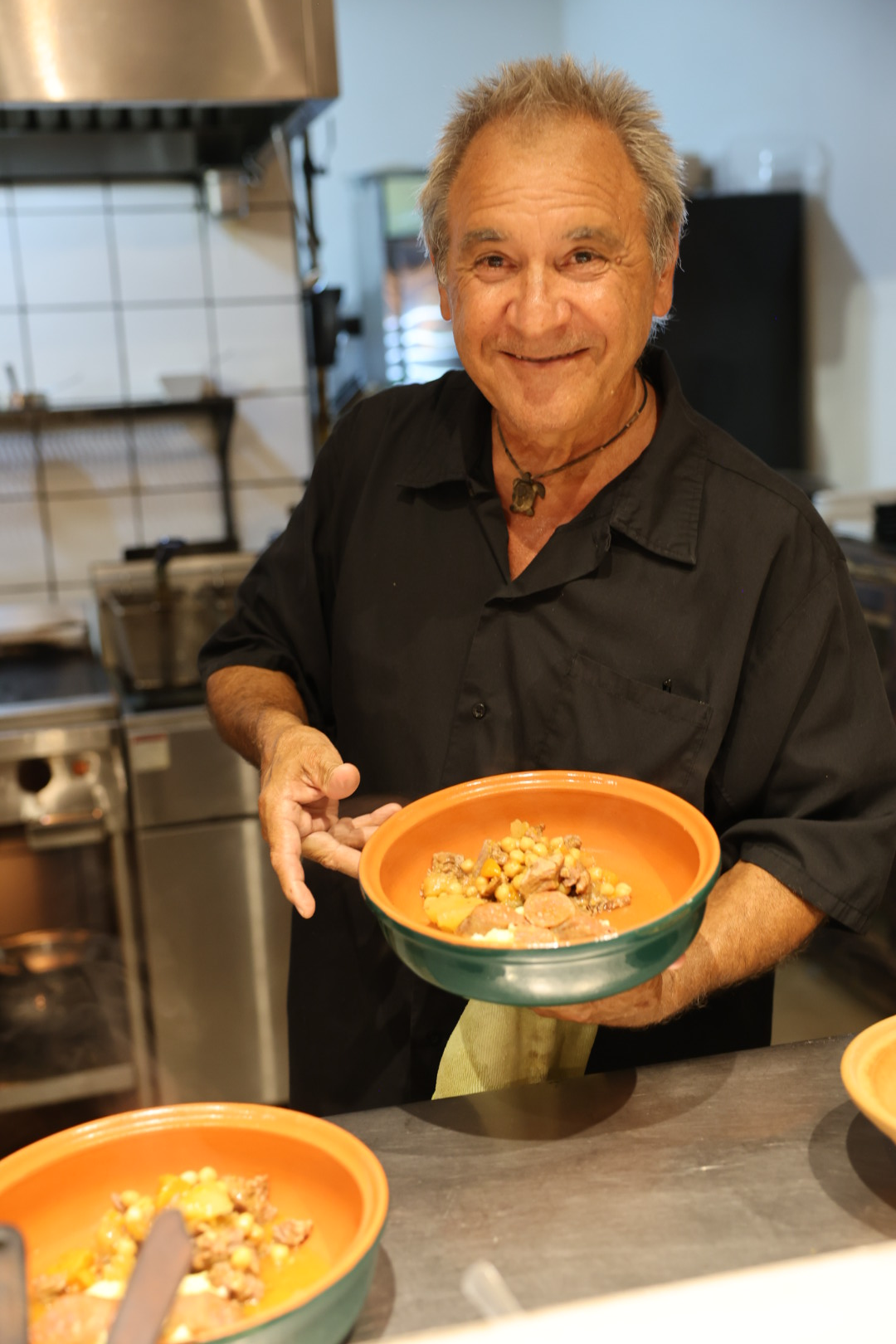
- Born: Valence, Drôme, France
- Spouse: Tasia Jamon
- Culinary career
- Current restaurant: Villa Deevena (2009-present)
- Previous restaurants: Le Vivarois; Les Anges (1981–1987); Hawaiian Naneloha resort hotel (1987–2009)

Patrick Jamon is a French chef who ran the kitchens of a Los Angeles restaurant, Les Anges, in the 1980s before moving to Hawaii in 1987 to be the executive chef at Naneloha resort hotel. In 2009 he opened his own restaurant with his wife, Tasia, in Playa Negra Costa Rica called Villa Deevena.

== Early life ==
Patrick Jamon was born in Valence, Drôme, France, and started working in kitchens at the age of 14. He attended culinary school in Paris before meeting and marrying his wife, Tasia Jamon.

== Career ==
Jamon apprenticed at Pic and became a chef cuisinier under Claude Peyrot at Le Vivarois in Paris. Jamon left Le Vivarois and immigrated to the United States in 1981, aged 28, with $500 to his name (equivalent to $1,771 in 2025) and no knowledge of English. He started working at the high-end restaurant Les Anges in Los Angeles, where he managed its kitchens and was a partner. He has served dignitaries and presidents at the Regency Club in Westwood. By 1982, Les Anges was considered one of the top restaurants in the city.

In 1987 he moved his family to Hawaii to work as the executive chef at the Naneloha resort hotel. At the time of his departure from Los Angeles, the Los Angeles Times lamented the city's loss of what the paper considered "one of Los Angeles' most talented French chefs". Les Anges was noted as being defunct the following year.

The Jamon family fell in love with Costa Rica on surfing trips in the 1990s and decided to relocate to the island in 2008, where he opened his own restaurant called Villa Deevena the following year.
